Chinchaysuyoa labiata is a species of catfish in the family Ariidae. It was first described under the genus Arius as Arius labiatus in 1898. Another fish species, Hexanematichthys henni, was described by Homer Glenn Fisher and Carl H. Eigenmann in 1922 but is now considered to be a junior synonym for A. labiatus. A study in 2019 found that A. labiatus was distinct from any other catfish species in the region, and thus constructed the genus Chinchaysuyoa for it and the recently discovered species C. ortegai. It is endemic to freshwater bodies in Ecuador.

References

Ariidae
Fish described in 1898
Freshwater fish of Ecuador
Endemic fauna of Ecuador